Budziszewice  is a village in Tomaszów Mazowiecki County, Łódź Voivodeship, in central Poland. It is the seat of the gmina (administrative district) called Gmina Budziszewice.

The village has a population of 880.

References

Villages in Tomaszów Mazowiecki County
Piotrków Governorate
Łódź Voivodeship (1919–1939)